The Brazilian squirrel (or Guianan squirrel) (Sciurus aestuans) is a tree squirrel in the genus Sciurus endemic to South America. It is found in South-eastern Colombia, Brazil, Guyana, French Guiana, Suriname and Venezuela.

It is a dark brown squirrel that feeds mainly on fruits and nuts, but can also prey on eggs and the young of birds.

References 

 John F. Eisenberg and Kent H. Redford, 2000. Mammals of Neotropics: Ecuador, Bolivia and Brazil.

Sciurus
Mammals of Brazil
Mammals of French Guiana
Mammals of Guyana
Mammals of Suriname
Mammals of Venezuela
Mammals described in 1766
Taxa named by Carl Linnaeus